Donna Smellie (born 2 September 1964) is a Canadian athlete. She competed in the women's heptathlon at the 1984 Summer Olympics.

References

External links
 

1964 births
Living people
Athletes (track and field) at the 1984 Summer Olympics
Canadian heptathletes
Canadian female long jumpers
Canadian female hurdlers
Olympic track and field athletes of Canada
Athletes (track and field) at the 1990 Commonwealth Games
Commonwealth Games competitors for Canada
Athletes from Mississauga
Black Canadian female track and field athletes